Russell Pond is a  pond in Kingston, Massachusetts. The pond is located northeast of Indian Pond off Route 80. The pond is the headwaters to Furnace Brook, a tributary of the Jones River. The water quality is impaired due to non-native aquatic plants and non-native fish in the pond.

External links
Environmental Protection Agency
South Shore Coastal Watersheds - Lake Assessments

Ponds of Plymouth County, Massachusetts
Ponds of Massachusetts